Paul-Loup Chatin (born 19 October 1991) is a professional racing driver from France who currently competes in the European Le Mans Series with IDEC Sport. He won the European Le Mans Series LMP2 class title in 2014 and 2019.

Career

Karting
Born in Dourdan, Chatin began his karting career in 2006 at the age of 14, progressing to the KF2 category by 2008.

Formula Renault
Chatin made his début in single-seater in 2010, joining the F4 Eurocup 1.6 series. Chatin finished fourth in the championship, with two wins at Silverstone, behind his future Eurocup rivals Stoffel Vandoorne and Norman Nato.

In 2011, he graduated to the Eurocup Formula Renault 2.0 series, with the Tech 1 Racing team. He finished ninth with a win on home soil at Le Castellet, and another podium finish, at Silverstone. He also had a full-time campaign in Formula Renault 2.0 Alps with the same team, collecting three consecutive victories at the Hungaroring and Le Castellet, finally finishing third in the championship.

For the 2012 season, Chatin remained in the Eurocup with Tech 1. He improved to sixth in the championship, but failed to achieve a victory during the campaign. He defended his third position in Formula Renault 2.0 Alps, losing the title fight to Daniil Kvyat and Nato.

Sports car racing
In 2013, Chatin decided to switch to sports car racing, joining Team Endurance Challenge in the LMPC category of the European Le Mans Series. He had just one full-time rival and clinched the series title after three wins at Imola, Spielberg and the Hungaroring.

For the 2014 season he moved to the LMP2 category, joining the Signatech Alpine squad. He was victorious at Spielberg and had another two podiums on his way to the championship title, with team-mates Nelson Panciatici and Oliver Webb. Chatin also contested the 24 Hours of Le Mans, where he finished third in the LMP2 category.

Racing record

Career summary

24 Hours of Daytona results

Complete FIA World Endurance Championship results
(key) (Races in bold indicate pole position; races in italics indicate fastest lap)

Complete European Le Mans Series results 
(key) (Races in bold indicate pole position; results in italics indicate fastest lap)

24 Hours of Le Mans results

Awards & Nationale Team

Complete WeatherTech SportsCar Championship results
(key) (Races in bold indicate pole position; results in italics indicate fastest lap)

References

External links
 

1991 births
Living people
People from Dourdan
French racing drivers
French F4 Championship drivers
Formula Renault Eurocup drivers
Formula Renault 2.0 Alps drivers
European Le Mans Series drivers
24 Hours of Daytona drivers
24 Hours of Le Mans drivers
FIA World Endurance Championship drivers
Blancpain Endurance Series drivers
24 Hours of Spa drivers
Sportspeople from Essonne
WeatherTech SportsCar Championship drivers
Racing Team Nederland drivers
Signature Team drivers
Tech 1 Racing drivers
Auto Sport Academy drivers
Oreca drivers
24H Series drivers
GT4 European Series drivers